Alexandra Olsson (born 5 April 1998) is a Finnish handball player for HIFK Handboll and the Finnish national team.

References

1998 births
Living people
Finnish female handball players
People from Kauniainen
Sportspeople from Uusimaa